Raineya orbicola is a species of bacteria in the phylum Bacteroidota.

References

Cytophagia
Gram-negative bacteria
Bacteria described in 2018